John Erskine, 18th Earl of Mar may refer to:

 John Erskine, Earl of Mar (died 1572), regarded as 18th earl by some sources, and 17th by others. 
 John Erskine, Earl of Mar (1558–1634), regarded as 19th earl by some sources, and 18th by others.

See also 
Earl of Mar#Notes